Frank D. Comerford Dam is an International Style concrete dam in the Fifteen Mile Falls of the Connecticut River, on the border between the U.S. states of New Hampshire and Vermont. The dam is near Monroe, New Hampshire and Barnet, Vermont. Construction began in 1928 and was completed in 1931. The dam and the power plant were acquired by a subsidiary of Hydro-Québec from Great River Hydro, LLC, in October 2022. 
 
Comerford Reservoir is the reservoir created behind the dam, named after Frank D. Comerford, president of the Connecticut River Power Company and the New England Power Company.

Hydroelectric power plants have the ability to vary the amount of power generated, depending on the demand. Steam turbine power plants are not as easily "throttled" because of the amount of thermodynamic inertia contained in their systems.

Geology
The area was called "Fifteen Mile Falls."

History
On September 30, 1930, President Herbert Hoover remotely initiated the generation of electricity from Comerford Dam, then New England's largest single hydroelectric development. This was the first in a series, harnessing hydroelectric power in the United States in the 1930s. The power was sent  for use in Massachusetts.

In 2005, USGen New England sold the dam to TransCanada Hydro Northeast Inc. The dam and the power plant were acquired by Great River Hydro, LLC, in April 2017 and by Hydro-Québec in October 2022.

Construction
A camp was constructed in East Barnet, Vermont, in 1928 for 1,500 workers. The camp contained its own housing, commissary, theater (which substituted as a church on Sunday), and a hospital. It had its own hockey and basketball teams. 120 people prepared and served meals. 1,300 men worked the day shift from 7:00 to 6:00 with one hour off for lunch. 300 men worked the night shift.

Construction materials were supplied on a special  railroad track built to the site.

Major structures
Four steel penstocks feed water to the powerhouse, where four Francis turbines rated 54,200 horsepower each produce a combined capacity of 140 megawatts at a combined discharge flow of 13,300 cubic feet per second. The remaining structure is an  spillway which is used to discharge water excess to generating requirements.

See also

McIndoes Reservoir

References

External links

How the site was selected for damming

Crossings of the Connecticut River
Dams in New Hampshire
Dams in Vermont
Buildings and structures in Grafton County, New Hampshire
Hydroelectric power plants in New Hampshire
Hydroelectric power plants in Vermont
Buildings and structures in Barnet, Vermont
TC Energy dams
Dams completed in 1930
Energy infrastructure completed in 1930
1930 establishments in Vermont